Pseudancistrus papariae is a species of catfish in the family Loricariidae. It is native to South America, where it occurs in Lake Papari and the Jaguaribe River basin in Brazil. The species reaches 15.3 cm (6 inches) SL.

References 

Fish described in 1941
papariae